In geophysics, the Curie depth is the depth at which rocks in a specific geographical area encounter the Curie temperature. This depth can be approximated from aeromagnetic survey data through spectral analysis or forward modeling.

References

Geomagnetism
Geophysical survey